The Nathan Cummings Foundation was endowed by Nathan Cummings (1896–1985), founder of Consolidated Foods, later renamed Sara Lee. Cummings was also a prominent art collector and supporter of Jewish causes.

In his lifetime, Cummings made contributions to hospitals, universities, and the arts.
His endowment created the Nathan Cummings Arts Center at Stanford University and the Joanne and Nathan Cummings Art Center at Connecticut College in New London. He made major contributions to the National Gallery of Art in Washington DC, to the Metropolitan Museum of Art, New York, and to the Art Institute of Chicago. The foundation received most of his estate (then estimated at $200 million) upon his death in 1985.

Shareholder activism 
The Nathan Cummings Foundation is one of eight institutional investors represented by the Shareholder Rights Projects, which worked to present shareholder declassification proposals in S&P 500 annual meetings.

References

External links
 

Arts foundations based in the United States
Arts organizations based in New York City
Organizations established in 1949
1949 establishments in the United States